Our Lady of the Mount Catholic Church in Honolulu is a parish of the Roman Catholic Church of Hawaii in the United States.  It falls under the jurisdiction of the Diocese of Honolulu and its bishop.  Located in the Kalihi Valley neighborhood community, it once served the immigrant Portuguese pineapple and sugarcane plantation laborers of the early 20th century.  They dedicated their church to Nossa Sanhora do Monte or Our Lady of the Mount, in honor of the Blessed Virgin Mary.

Resources
Our Lady of the Mount Catholic Church in Honolulu

Roman Catholic Diocese of Honolulu
Roman Catholic churches in Hawaii
Buildings and structures in Honolulu